"Higher Love" is a 1986 song by English singer Steve Winwood. It was the first single released from his fourth solo LP, Back in the High Life (1986). It was written by Winwood and Will Jennings and produced by Russ Titelman and Winwood. The female vocals on the song were performed by Chaka Khan, who also appeared in the music video.

"Higher Love" was Winwood's first Billboard Hot 100 number-one song, topping the chart for one week. "Higher Love" also spent four weeks atop the US Billboard Album Rock Tracks chart and earned two Grammy Awards, for Record of the Year and Best Male Pop Vocal Performance. It also peaked at number 13 in the United Kingdom, Winwood's highest charting solo entry there, and reached number one in Canada for a week.

Whitney Houston covered the song in 1990 and it was included as a bonus track on the Japanese edition of her third studio album I'm Your Baby Tonight. In 2016, Winwood made a version with his daughter Lilly Winwood, performing a duet for a Hershey commercial. Norwegian DJ Kygo reworked Houston's cover into a tropical house track in 2019, which was released as a single worldwide and hit number one on Billboard magazine's Dance Club Songs chart, making it Houston's highest-charting posthumous release to date.

Background
Music engineer Tom Lord-Alge had suggested moving one of John Robinson's impromptu drum fills to the beginning of "Higher Love", by assigning a timing offset to one of two tape machines such that they first played the drum fill followed by the song coming in on the beat. Titelman was happy with the result and decided to open the album with this drum fill. JR used a Latin rimshot technique across the top of his classic seamless brass Ludwig Black Beauty snare, unmuffled, with its snare wires disengaged, to emulate the sound of a timbale. He said, "it's one of the best drum intros I've ever played."

Producer Russ Titelman remembered the fill being played ad lib by JR while his friend Chaka Khan was preparing to sing her background vocals on "Higher Love", causing Khan to exclaim "What is that shit? It sounds like voodoo shit!" Tom Lord-Alge agreed that the drum fill was played as a lark after JR completed his drum overdubs for "Higher Love". Tom said, "It was one of those happy accidents, and it happened because Chris always taught me that if the tape is rolling and there's a musician in the studio, make sure the tape machine is in record!"

Music video
The music video for the song was Winwood's first. It uses the shorter single version and was shot in June 1986 by directors Peter Kagan and Paula Greif. Kagan and Greif shot an almost identical video for Duran Duran's "Notorious" in November of that year; coincidentally, both videos were nominated for several awards at the 1987 MTV Video Music Awards though neither won. Chaka Khan appears in the video, as does Nile Rodgers, who plays guitar with the backing band.

Track listings

 7-inch: Island / IS 288 United Kingdom
 "Higher Love" – 4:14
 "And I Go" – 4:12

 7-inch: Island / 7-28710 United States
 "Higher Love" – 4:14
 "And I Go" – 4:12

 12-inch: Island / 12 IS 288 United Kingdom
 "Higher Love" (remix) – 7:45
 "Higher Love" (instrumental) – 6:05
 "And I Go" – 4:12

* Tracks one and two remixed by Tom Lord-Alge

 12-inch: Island / PRO-A-2507 United States
 "Higher Love" (edit) – 4:08
 "Higher Love" (LP version) – 5:45

 US promo 12-inch

Personnel
 Steve Winwood – lead and backing vocals, synthesizer, sequencer programming, and Oberheim DMX programming
 Chaka Khan – backing vocals
 Nile Rodgers – rhythm guitar
 Robbie Kilgore – synthesizer and sequencer programming 
 Andrew Thomas – PPG Waveterm synthesizer programming
 David Frank – synthesizer horns and synth horn arrangement
 Philippe Saisse – synthesizer bass
 Eddie Martinez – lead guitar
 John Robinson – drums
 Jimmy Bralower – Oberheim DMX programming
 Carole Steele – congas, tambourine

Charts and certifications

Weekly charts

Year-end charts

Certifications

Kygo and Whitney Houston version

A cover of "Higher Love" was released as a single by Norwegian DJ and record producer Kygo and late American singer Whitney Houston on 28 June 2019. The song was released to streaming and digital download formats on 28 June 2019 by the label RCA Records. The song is the lead single from Kygo's third studio album, Golden Hour. The song marks Houston's first posthumous release in two and a half years, following the song "Memories", which was released as a duet with Malaysian singer Siti Nurhaliza in December 2016. It was also featured in a Ford Summer Sales Event commercial in 2020.

Houston's cover of the Winwood track was originally included on the Japanese edition of her third studio album, I'm Your Baby Tonight (1990). This version of the track was produced by American musician Narada Michael Walden, and therefore Walden is credited as a producer of "Higher Love" alongside Kygo. Houston performed her rendition of "Higher Love" at the 14 dates of her 1990 Feels So Right Tour in Japan.

In the UK, "Higher Love" was a commercial success, surpassing the Winwood version in terms of chart performance. It peaked at number two in the UK Singles Chart, making it Kygo's third top ten song there and first to reach the nation's top five, and Houston's eighteenth to peak within the top ten. It is also Houston's first posthumous top 10 track. She had last reached the top ten with "Million Dollar Bill" charting at number five in October 2009. Therefore, "Higher Love" became her highest-charting single in the UK since 1999 when "My Love Is Your Love" peaked at number two. In Scotland, the song peaked at number one.

Since its release, "Higher Love" has reached the top five in Croatia, Flanders, Ireland, Israel, Latvia, Norway, Slovakia, and Slovenia, plus the top ten in the Netherlands, Hungary, Sweden, and Switzerland. It also hit the top twenty charts in Australia, Austria, China, Czech Republic, and Wallonia. In the U.S., "Higher Love" debuted at number 63 on the Billboard Hot 100 chart, with 6.6 million US streams in its first week; it was also its peak position. The song topped Billboard's Dance Club Songs chart in the US, becoming Kygo's third number one on the chart and Houston's fourteenth.

In September 2020, the song was nominated at the Billboard Music Awards for Top Dance/Electronic Song. The Recording Industry Association of America would certify the single Platinum in the USA also.

Notably, "Higher Love" was played immediately following Joe Biden's victory speech after his election as the 46th President of the United States on 7 November 2020. Writing for Billboard, Katie Bain described the song's use in a political setting: "Indeed, after Biden shared his vision of 'a nation united, a nation strengthened. A nation healed, 'Higher Love' backed up the message, particularly for those who know all the words... Few sentiments could so effectively summarize the weary travails of the American collective consciousness during the past four years."

The song also appears on the US and European vinyl edition of Houston's hits compilation album, I Will Always Love You: The Best of Whitney Houston released in October 2021 on RCA Records.

Music video
The official video, directed by Hannah Lux Davis, was made available on YouTube on 26 August 2019. It begins with a group of men in modern clothing walking through seemingly abandoned warehouses. They are impressed to see a 1980s aerobics class led by an instructor played by Canadian actress Vanessa Morgan. After initially being shooed away, the male lead walks into the room and suddenly wears a 1980s aerobics outfit. He starts dancing with the female lead and is eventually joined by his male companions.

The video has brief snippets of Whitney Houston's "I Wanna Dance with Somebody" music video showing on a TV along with posters of her from the 1987 Whitney album on the wall. In the end, the instructor is accidentally kicked in the face by one of the dancers and wakes up in a present-day outdoor café, revealing that the 1980s aerobics class was just a dream and that the male lead is actually her waiter.

Personnel
 Whitney Houston – lead vocals, backing vocals/arrangement, vocal production
 Narada Michael Walden – backing vocals arrangement, producer, arranger
 Kygo – producer, remixer, arranger
 Claytoven Richardson, Jeanie Tracy, Anne Stocking, Larry Batiste, Skyler Jett, Kitty Beethoven, Cynthia Shiloh, Greg "Gigi" Gonaway, Raz Kennedy, Cornell "CC" Carter, Lydette Stephens, Renee Cattaneo, Tina Thompson, Sylvester Jackson – backing vocals

Charts

Weekly charts

Year-end charts

Certifications

References

External links
Steve Winwood website album details
Songfacts - Back In The High Life Again entry

1986 songs
1986 singles
Steve Winwood songs
British soft rock songs
Billboard Hot 100 number-one singles
Cashbox number-one singles
RPM Top Singles number-one singles
Grammy Award for Record of the Year
Grammy Award for Best Male Pop Vocal Performance
Songs with lyrics by Will Jennings
Songs written by Steve Winwood
Song recordings produced by Russ Titelman
Island Records singles

Whitney Houston songs
Song recordings produced by Narada Michael Walden

2019 singles
Kygo songs
Music videos directed by Hannah Lux Davis
Number-one singles in Scotland
Tropical house songs
RCA Records singles
Song recordings produced by Kygo
Songs released posthumously